The Diocese of Ulcinj (Latin Ulcinium, Italian Dulcigno) was a Catholic bishopric with see at Ulcinj, in Montenegro, which existed from circa 800 till 1532 and was revived as Latin titular see.

Established circa 800 as Diocese of Ulcinj without direct precursor, but its territory formerly was under the Ancient Metropolitan Archdiocese of Doclea.

In 1532, Pope Clement VII appointed James Dalmas the bishop of Ulcinj. Dalmas was also a bishop of Budva, and the diocese was effectively merged into the Roman Catholic Diocese of Budua.

References

Sources and external links 
 GCatholic, with Google satellite photo

Catholic titular sees in Europe